Chilelopsis calderoni is a species of mygalomorph spiders of Chile, named after Dr Raúl Calderón. Males differ from C. puertoviejo in the more sinuous distal portion of the bulbal duct; females differ in the spermathecae with a distinct fundus and a narrowed duct. Males differ from C. serena by the presence of a dense patch of setae on the anterior tibiae, females in the undivided spermathecae.

Description
Female: total length ; cephalothorax length , width ; cephalic region length , width ; fovea width ; medial ocular quadrangle length , width ; labium length , width ; sternum length , width ; clypeus width . Its cephalic region is wide and convex, while its fovea is deep, and straight. Its labium possesses no cuspules, and a serrula is absent. Its sternal sigilla is small and oval. Its chelicerae are robust and short; rastellum formed by long and attenuate but stiff setae. The entire spider is a light yellow colour, while its abdomen has a series of mottles along its dorsum.
Male: total length ; cephalothorax length , width ; labium length is 0.62 of its width; sternum width is 0.92 of its length. Its cephalic region is wide and short. Its clypeus is wide. Chelicerae has a weak rastellum, with a large intercheliceral tumescence. Its labium possesses 3 cusps. Its posterior sigilla is large and separated from margin. Its legs and cephalothorax are a yellowish colour, while its abdomen is yellowish with brown spots.

Distribution
Sand dunes in Regions III (Atacama Region) and IV (Coquimbo Region).

See also
Spider anatomy
List of Nemesiidae species
Regions of Chile

References

External links

ADW entry

Nemesiidae
Spiders of South America
Spiders described in 1995
Endemic fauna of Chile